Tynanthus polyanthus, the bejuco de clavo is a flowering plant species in the genus Tynanthus.

References

External links 

Bignoniaceae
Plants described in 1954